Hard metal may refer to:
 Cemented carbide (widia), hard material used for machining
 Heavy metal music, music genre
 Hard Metal, Yugoslav magazine dedicated to heavy metal music